Hordeum secalinum, false rye barley and meadow barley (a name it shares with Hordeum brachyantherum), is a species of wild barley native to Europe, including the Madeiras, Crimea and the north Caucasus, northwest Africa, and the Levant. It has been introduced to Australia and New Zealand. An allotetraploid, it arose from ancestors with the Xa and I Hordeum genomes.

References

secalinum
Plants described in 1771
Taxa named by Johann Christian Daniel von Schreber